Raspberry juice is a liquid created from raspberries that is often either used as a part of a mixed drink, added in with other liquids such as orange juice, or consumed by itself. The juice is known for containing a large amount of vitamin C as well as biological iron, which means it is sometimes drunk when an individual feels feverish. Soft drinks that incorporate raspberry juice notably include Bouvrage, a product made from Scottish raspberries that the husband and wife team Anne Thomson and John Gallagher created. Launched in 1998 at that year's Royal Highland Show, that particular drink includes sparkling water and is designed to be somewhat sweet yet having a fruit content in contrast to competing products.

Raspberry juice can also be used to make smoothies. Other berries, such as blueberries, are commonly added either in whole, crushed, or juiced form.

Other examples of its use include as a part of cocktails, being a part of mixed alcoholic drinks served in bars and restaurants, and as a key ingredient in making the raspberry jelly desserts.

In terms of background, raspberries are an important commercial fruit crop not just in heavily cultivated, temperate areas but around the world. The top ten countries in terms of production include Mexico, Poland, Russia, and the United States.

See also

Juicing
List of juices

References

Fruit juice
Juice